Brian Robert Snyder (born February 20, 1958) is an American former professional baseball pitcher for the Seattle Mariners and Oakland Athletics of Major League Baseball.

He mentored Bobby Wahl while Wahl attended high school.

References

External links

Baseball Reference (Minors)
Baseball Gauge
Retrosheet
Venezuelan Professional Baseball League

1958 births
Living people
People from Flemington, New Jersey
Sportspeople from Hunterdon County, New Jersey
Alexandria Mariners players
American expatriate baseball players in Canada
Baseball players from New Jersey
Calgary Cannons players
Chantilly High School alumni
Clemson Tigers baseball players
Las Vegas Stars (baseball) players
Leones del Caracas players
American expatriate baseball players in Venezuela
Major League Baseball pitchers
Oakland Athletics players
Richmond Braves players
Salt Lake City Gulls players
San Jose Missions players
Seattle Mariners players
Tacoma Tigers players
Wausau Timbers players